John Moland (170030 December 1760) was born around 1700 in London.

He studied law at the Inner Temple, where his name was recorded as John Morland and a note says that he was commissioned King's Attorney in Pennsylvania. In Pennsylvania, he practiced law in Lancaster County before marrying Catherine Hutchinson around 1738.

In 1744 he was residing in Rockhill Township, Bucks County, Pennsylvania. In June 1745 he purchased  on the Frankford Road in Philadelphia County and resided there afterwards. This area was later known as Rose Hill.

From 1748 until his death, he was the leader of the bar of Pennsylvania and instructor for future founding fathers John Dickinson and George Read. He was admitted to the Pennsylvania Provincial Council on 19 June 1759.

He died on 30 December 1760, and was buried on 2 January 1761.

1700s births
1760 deaths
Pennsylvania lawyers
People from Bucks County, Pennsylvania
Lawyers from London
Year of birth uncertain
People of colonial Pennsylvania